Jeremy A. Dauber is the Atran Professor of Yiddish Language, Literature, and Culture in the Department of Germanic Languages at Columbia University, specializing in Yiddish and Jewish literature, American Jewish culture, and American studies.

Since 2008, he has been the director of the Institute for Israel and Jewish Studies at Columbia. In 2009, he was named an inaugural member of the Shalom Hartman Institute North American Scholars Circle.

A native of Teaneck, New Jersey, Dauber attended Yavneh Academy and is a 1990 graduate of the Frisch School in Paramus, New Jersey. He graduated from Harvard College in 1995 summa cum laude and did his doctoral work at Oxford.

He wrote a column on television and movies for the Christian Science Monitor that was recognized by the National Society of Newspaper Columnists in 2003.

The Jewish Week has described Dauber's rapid ascent to a position of influence in Yiddish letters, “Within a year of completing his doctorate in Yiddish literature at Oxford University, Jeremy Dauber returned to the United States, found a job heading the Yiddish studies program at Columbia University, and was invited by the National Yiddish Book Center to manage its ambitious compilation of a list of the 100 greatest works of modern Jewish literature. Suddenly the 27-year-old assistant professor of Germanic languages and literatures found himself in a significant position to influence the future of a field that wasn't much older than he was.” 

Dauber's research interests include Yiddish literature of the early modern period, Hebrew and Yiddish literature of the nineteenth century, the Yiddish theater, the history of Jewish comedy, and American Jewish literature.

Dauber is co-editor of the journal Prooftexts: A Journal of Jewish Literary History.

Books
Antonio's Devils: Writers of the Jewish Enlightenment and the Birth of Modern Hebrew and Yiddish Literature (Stanford University Press, 2004)
The Range of Yiddish: A Catalog of an Exhibition from the Yiddish Collection of the Harvard College Library, Marion Aptroot and Jeremy Dauber, Harvard University Press, 2005.
Landmark Yiddish Plays (SUNY Press, 2006) co-editor and -translator, with Joel Berkowitz
The Worlds of Sholem Aleichem: The Remarkable Life and Afterlife of the Man Who Created Tevye (Schocken, 2013)
Jewish Comedy: A Serious History (W.W. Norton, 2017)
 American Comics: A History (W.W. Norton, 2021)

Prizes and awards
Rhodes Scholarship at Oxford from 1996 to 1999

References

Living people
1970s births
Columbia University faculty
Frisch School alumni
Harvard College alumni
American humanities academics
Yiddish-language literature
People from Teaneck, New Jersey
Academic journal editors